Melody Calling is the debut EP by British indie rock band The Vaccines, that follows the release of their second studio album Come of Age. The EP was released on Columbia Records on 11 August 2013 in the UK and 12 August worldwide. The EP features three new tracks and a remixed version of the second track "Do You Want a Man?", remixed by producers John Hill and Rich Costey. The title track was released on the internet on 25 June through the band's Facebook page, along with other tracks during the following period preceding the physical release.

Track listing

Charts

References

2013 debut EPs
The Vaccines albums
Albums produced by John Hill (record producer)
Albums produced by Rich Costey